Lucky Seven is the seventh album by jazz keyboardist Bob James.

Track listing
All songs are written by Bob James except where noted.

"Rush Hour" – 6:39
"Blue Lick" – 5:31
"Look-Alike" – 5:30
"Big Stone City" – 5:42
"Friends" (Neil Jason, Kash Monet, Jeff Schoen) – 4:41
"Fly Away" – 6:44

Personnel 
 Bob James – acoustic piano, Fender Rhodes, Oberheim Polyphonic synthesizer, arrangements and conductor 
 Hiram Bullock – electric guitar (1, 4, 5, 6)
 Eric Gale– electric guitar (2, 3)
 Steve Khan – acoustic guitar (3)
 Richard Resnicoff– acoustic guitar (5, 6)
 Neil Jason – bass (1, 2, 4, 5)
 Gary King – bass (3, 6)
 Steve Gadd – drums (1, 2)
 Andy Newmark – drums (3)
 Idris Muhammad – drums (4, 5, 6)
 Jimmy Maelen – percussion (1, 2, 4, 5, 6)
 Ralph MacDonald – percussion (3)

Brass and Woodwinds
 Michael Brecker – saxophone solo (4)
 David Sanborn – saxophone
 George Marge – woodwinds
 Wayne Andre – trombone
 Dave Taylor – trombone
 Randy Brecker – trumpet
 Jon Faddis – trumpet
 Mike Lawrence – trumpet
 James Buffington – French horn
 Peter Gordon – French horn

Strings
 David Nadien – concertmaster 
 Jonathan Abramowitz and Charles McCracken – cello
 Lamar Alsop and Theodore Israel – viola
 Lamar Alsop, Max Ellen, Barry Finclair, Diana Halprin, Harry Lookofsky, Marvin Morgenstern, Herbert Sorkin and Richard Sortomme – violin

Vocals
 Patti Austin – backing vocals 
 Hiram Bullock – backing vocals 
 Bob James – backing vocals 
 Neil Jason – lead vocals (5)
 Jeff Schoen – backing vocals

Production 
 Bob James – producer 
 Joe Jorgensen – co-producer, recording, mixing 
 Vern Carlson – assistant engineer
 Ollie Cotton – assistant engineer
 Jeff Hendrickson – assistant engineer
 Stan Kalina – mastering 
 Paula Scher – art direction, design
 Buddy Endress – cover photography 
 David Gahr – inside photography

Studios
 Recorded at A&R Recording, Mediasound, Sound Mixers and The Power Station (New York, NY).
 Mastered at CBS Studios (New York, NY).

Charts

References

External links 
 Bob James-Lucky Seven at Discogs

1979 albums
Bob James (musician) albums
Albums produced by Bob James (musician)